What's the 411? Remix is a remix album by R&B singer Mary J. Blige, released on December 7, 1993 by Uptown Records and MCA Records. It is composed of remixed tracks from Blige's critically acclaimed debut album, and involved record producers and recording artists including Sean "Puffy" Combs, Teddy Riley, Eddie "F" Ferrell, Craig Mack, Heavy D, the Notorious B.I.G., and K-Ci Hailey. The album received favorable reviews, and debuted at number 118 on the Billboard 200, and number 22 on Billboard's Top R&B/Hip-Hop Albums chart.

Track listing

Sample credits
 "Real Love (Remix)" contains a sample of "Superman Theme" as performed by Leon Klatzkin, "Clean Up Woman" as performed by Betty Wright, "Hihache" as performed by Lafayette Afro Rock Band, and "So Wat Cha Sayin'" as performed by EPMD.
 "Love No Limit (Puffy's Remix)" contains a sample of "Risin' to the Top" as performed by Keni Burke.
 "You Don't Have to Worry (Remix Main with Rap)" contains a sample of "Ode to Billie Joe" as performed by Lou Donaldson.
 "What's the 411? (Remix)" contains a sample of "Superman Lover" as performed by Johnny "Guitar" Watson, and a portion of The Notorious B.I.G.'s "Just Playing (Dreams)".
 "Reminisce (Bad Boy Remix)" contains a sample of "New Generation" as performed by The Classical Two and "They Reminisce Over You (T.R.O.Y.)" as performed by Pete Rock & C.L. Smooth.

Charts

Weekly charts

Year-end charts

References

External links 
 What's the 411? Remix at discogs.com

Mary J. Blige albums
1993 remix albums
MCA Records remix albums
Uptown Records remix albums
Neo soul remix albums